James Horatio Nickalls (29 May 1934 – June 2016) was an English footballer who played as a centre half in the Football League for Darlington. He was on Sunderland's books without representing them in the League.

References

1934 births
2016 deaths
People from Amble
Footballers from Northumberland
English footballers
Association football defenders
Sunderland A.F.C. players
Darlington F.C. players
English Football League players